Gil Young-ah (born April 11, 1970 in Ansan, Gyeonggi-do) is a former female badminton player from South Korea.

At the 1992 Summer Olympics in Barcelona, she won the bronze medal in the women's doubles together with Shim Eun-jung.

Four years later, at the Atlanta Olympics, she won the gold medal in the mixed doubles together with Kim Dong-moon and the silver medal in the women's doubles together with Jang Hye-ock.

Gil retired from badminton after the 1996 Olympics and became an assistant coach of the Samsung Electro-Mechanics badminton team. In 2011, Gil became the first woman to be appointed head coach of a professional team in Korea.  She was made Head Coach of the Samsung Electromechanics Women's Badminton Team. When Kim Moon-soo vacated his post as head of the men's team in late 2015, Gil was made Head Coach of the combined team.

Gil has two children who are active elite badminton players.  Her son Kim Won-ho is on the national team and her daughter Kim Ah-young plays for an elite high school team in Gyeonggi-do.

References

External links
 
 
 

South Korean female badminton players
Badminton players at the 1992 Summer Olympics
Badminton players at the 1996 Summer Olympics
Olympic badminton players of South Korea
Olympic bronze medalists for South Korea
Olympic gold medalists for South Korea
Olympic silver medalists for South Korea
Olympic medalists in badminton
Asian Games medalists in badminton
Sportspeople from Gyeonggi Province
1970 births
Living people
Badminton players at the 1994 Asian Games
Badminton players at the 1990 Asian Games
Medalists at the 1996 Summer Olympics
Medalists at the 1992 Summer Olympics
Haepyeong Gil clan
Asian Games gold medalists for South Korea
Asian Games silver medalists for South Korea
Asian Games bronze medalists for South Korea
Medalists at the 1990 Asian Games
Medalists at the 1994 Asian Games
20th-century South Korean women
21st-century South Korean women